The Kaiserbach (also called Sparchenbach) is a river of Tyrol, Austria, in the valley Kaisertal in the Kaiser Mountains in the Tyrolean Unterland. It rises at about  near the Stripsenjoch saddle and empties in Untere Sparchen, a quarter of Kufstein, into the Inn.

The Kaiserbach was important for forestry until the beginning of the 20th century. Felled logs were hauled from many wooded mountainsides in the side valleys of the Kaisertal to the river. The Kaiserbach was impounded ast several weirs. On subsequently opening the lock gates a strong current flowed, enabling the assembled logs to be transported in several stages to Kufstein.

The Kaiserbach forms most of the municipal boundary between Kufstein and Ebbs.

References

Rivers of Tyrol (state)
Kufstein
Rivers of Austria